Cresols (also known as hydroxytoluene, toluenol, benzol or cresylic acid) are a group of aromatic organic compounds. They are widely-occurring phenols (sometimes called phenolics) which may be either natural or manufactured. They are also categorized as methylphenols. Cresols commonly occur as either solids or liquids because their melting points are generally close to room temperature. Like other types of phenols, they are slowly oxidized by exposure to air, and the resulting impurities often give the samples a yellow to brownish red tint. Cresols have an odor characteristic to that of other simple phenols, reminiscent to some of a "coal tar" smell. The name "cresol" is an adduct of phenol and their traditional source, creosote.

Structure and production
In its chemical structure, a molecule of cresol has a methyl group substituted onto the ring of phenol. There are three forms (isomers) of cresol: ortho-cresol (o-cresol), meta-cresol (m-cresol), and para-cresol (p-cresol). These forms occur separately or as a mixture, which can also be called cresol or more specifically, tricresol. About half of the world's supply of cresols are extracted from coal tar. The rest is produced by hydrolysis of chlorotoluenes or the related sulfonates.  Another method entails methylation of phenol with methanol over a solid acid catalyst, often comprising magnesium oxide or alumina. Temperatures above 300 °C are typical. Anisole converts to cresols under these conditions.

Another isomer of cresol is called Benzyl alcohol, or alpha-cresol (α-cresol). Benzyl alcohol has a hydroxy group inside a methyl group on the benzene ring.

Applications 
Cresols are precursors or synthetic intermediates to other compounds and materials, including plastics, pesticides, pharmaceuticals, and dyes.

For cresol bactericides or disinfectants the mechanism of action is due to the destruction of bacterial cell membranes.

Most recently, cresols have been used to create a breakthrough in manufacturing carbon nanotubes at scale that are separated and not twisted, without additional chemicals that change the surface properties of the nanotubes.

Commercial examples
 Creolin, a 19th-century disinfectant.
 Carbolic soap, 19th-century.
 The original Lysol formulation, essentially a water solution of carbolic soap. "Lysol" has been used as a generic trademark to refer to such a cresol soap solution and remains used as such in some professional settings. The CAS number is 12772-68-8.

Derivatives 
Derivatives of p-cresol include:
Butylated hydroxytoluene, a common antioxidant

Derivatives of o-cresol include:
Indo-1, a popular calcium indicator
MCPA, (4-chloro-2-methylphenoxy)acetic acid
MCPB, 4-(4-chloro-2-methylphenoxy)butanoic acid
Mecoprop, (RS)-2-(4-chloro-2-methylphenoxy)propanoic acid
the amine atomoxetine, (3R)-N-methyl-3-(2-methylphenoxy)-3-phenylpropan-1-amine
the diol mephenesin, 3-(2-methylphenoxy)propane-1,2-diol

Derivatives of m-cresol include:
Amylmetacresol, an antiseptic
Bevantolol, (RS)-[2-(3,4-dimethoxyphenyl)ethyl][2-hydroxy-3-(3-methylphenoxy)propyl]amine
Bromocresol green
Bupranolol, a non-selective beta blocker
Chloro-m-cresol which is used as a household disinfectant
Tolimidone, 5-(3-methylphenoxy)pyrimidin-2(1H)-one

Health effects
When cresols are inhaled, ingested, or applied to the skin, they can be very harmful. Effects observed in people include irritation and burning of skin, eyes, mouth, and throat; abdominal pain and vomiting; heart damage; anemia; liver and kidney damage; facial paralysis; coma; and death.

Breathing high levels of cresols for a short time results in irritation of the nose and throat. Aside from these effects, very little is known about the effects of breathing cresols, for example, at lower levels over longer times.

Ingesting high levels results in kidney problems, mouth and throat burns, abdominal pain, vomiting, and effects on the blood and nervous system.

Skin contact with high levels of cresols can burn the skin and damage the kidneys, liver, blood, brain, and lungs.

Short-term and long-term studies with animals have shown similar effects from exposure to cresols. No human or animal studies have shown harmful effects from cresols on reproduction.

It is not known what the effects are from long-term ingestion or skin contact with low levels of cresols.

The Occupational Safety and Health Administration has set a permissible exposure limit at 5 ppm (22 mg/m3) over an eight-hour time-weighted average, while the National Institute for Occupational Safety and Health recommends a limit of  2.3 ppm (10 mg/m3).

See also
 Dihydroxytoluene
 Trihydroxytoluene

References

Antiseptics
Hazardous air pollutants
 
C